Hancox is a surname. Notable people with the surname include:

Allan Hancox (1932–2013), Kenyan lawyer and judge
Ben Hancox, English violinist
David Hancox, English footballer
Mitch Hancox (born 1993), English footballer
Richard Hancox (born 1968), English footballer
Stuart A. Hancox, English translator

See also
Hancock
Mount Hancox, mountain in Victoria Land, Antarctica

English-language surnames
Patronymic surnames